Pavel Alekseevich Volya (born 14 March 1979) is a Russian TV host, actor and singer. A former KVN player, he first came to prominence as the "resident" of the Russian Comedy Club show, co-produced by Garik Martirosyan and aired on TNT channel. In 2007, Volya released his first studio album. As of 2008, he hosts a TV Show on TNT.

Biography 
Born on March 14, 1979, in Penza. Graduated from school №. 11. In 2001 graduated from the Penza Pedagogical Institute (now - a faculty of Penza State University) with a degree in Russian language and literature. Immediately after graduating from university, he left for Moscow. Since 2005 - resident of the Comedy Club.

Personal life
Volya is married to sportswoman and TV presenter Lyasan Utiasheva and they have a son Robert, born 14 May 2013, and a daughter Sofia, born 6 May 2015.

Acting career
 2006 – Club ("Клуб", Russian TV Series)
 2007 – Surf's Up – Chicken Joe (Dubbing in the Russian version)
 2008 – The Best Movie ("Самый лучший фильм") – Tima Milan
 2008 – Plato ("Платон") – Plato
 2009 – Bride at any Cost ("Невеста любой ценой") – Stas
 2010 – Love in the Big City 2 ("Любовь в большом городе 2") – Hamlet The Taxi Driver
 2011 – Kiss through a Wall ("Поцелуй сквозь стену") – Kondratyev
 2011 – Office Romance. Our Time ("Служебный роман. Наше время") – Vadim The Secretary
 2011 – Paul – Paul (Dubbing in the Russian version)
 2012 – Happy New Year, My Mother! ("С новым годом, мамы!") – Son (In the storyline "To see Paris and...")

References

External links
 
Pavel Volya at the Forbes

Russian male film actors
Russian stand-up comedians
Russian male comedians
Russian television personalities
1979 births
Living people
People from Penza
Penza State University alumni
Russian TikTokers